Alaverdi or Allaverdy may refer to:

 Alaverdi, Armenia, a town in the province of Lori, Armenia
 Alaverdi Monastery, a Georgian Eastern Orthodox monastery in the region of Kakheti, Georgia (country)
 HMCS Allaverdy (Fy 06), a patrol boat in the Royal Canadian Navy

See also
 Alivardi Khan (1671–1756), Nawab of Bengal, 1740–1756
 Allahverdi (disambiguation)